Kahbad-e Yek (also Romanized as Kahbād-e Yek; also known as Kal Kūbād) is a village in Howmeh-ye Sharqi Rural District, in the Central District of Izeh County, Khuzestan Province, Iran. At the 2006 census, its population was 843, in 143 families.

References 

Populated places in Izeh County